Errances is the first full-length album by the French doom metal/gothic metal band Angellore. The title is French for 'wandering'. The album was first released as a digital version and later as CD through Dreamcell11.

Produced by Angellore and Florent Krist, it was mastered by Markus Skroch from the Kalthallen Studios (Germany). The layout and design is by Florent Castellani.

Writing and recording
Most of the songs were written by Walran and Rosarius between August 2007 and June 2009. Ronnie joined in Spring 2009, a few months before they entered the studio. The album was recorded and mixed between December 2009 and February 2011.

The song Dans Les Vallées Eternelles was inspired by the Draconian song The Cry of Silence and the While Heaven Wept song The Drowning Years. Weeping Ghost was the first song Angellore wrote, with the album version being the third version.

Track listing

Personnel

Angellore
 Rosarius – clean & harsh vocals, guitars, bass, keyboards
 Walran – clean & harsh vocals, keyboards
 Ronnie – drums

Session members
 Catherine Arquez – violin

References

External links
 

2012 debut albums
Angellore albums